Discover Oncology, formerly Hormones and Cancer, is a bimonthly peer-reviewed medical journal covering research on all aspects of hormone action on cancer. It was established in 2010 and is published by Springer Science + Business Media on behalf of The Endocrine Society. The editor-in-chief is Carol A. Lange (University of Minnesota).

Abstracting and indexing 
The journal is abstracted and indexed in:

External links 
 

Oncology journals
Bimonthly journals
Springer Science+Business Media
English-language journals
Publications established in 2010
Endocrinology journals